Stanley Appel (born 9 June 1933 in Stepney, East London) is a former British television producer and director of light entertainment at BBC television, most synonymous with his overhaul of Top of the Pops in the early 1990s, which saw the brief end to BBC Radio 1 DJs hosting the show.  He was also the producer of popular game show, Blankety Blank, during the Les Dawson era.  He also produced Marti Caine series, Leo Sayer series, Paul Daniels series, Lulu series, Mike Yarwood series and many more Light Entertainment shows.  Prior to joining Light Entertainment he was a senior TV studio cameraman for many years.

References

1933 births
British television producers
Living people